GalaxyCon LLC, formerly known as Super Conventions or Supercon, is a privately owned company based in Fort Lauderdale, Florida that organizes comic book and anime conventions in the United States. Events currently include GalaxyCon Raleigh (formerly Raleigh Supercon) in Raleigh, North Carolina, GalaxyCon Richmond in Richmond, Virginia, GalaxyCon Columbus in Columbus, Ohio and GalaxyCon Austin in Austin, Texas.

As of 2019, the "Supercon" trademark only applies to Florida Supercon. All other conventions have been renamed GalaxyCon. Florida Supercon, held in the Miami and Fort Lauderdale metro areas, was sold to ReedPop in early 2019.

History
The first Supercon was organized by founder Mike Broder in late 2006 at the Ramada Hollywood Beach Resort in Hollywood, Florida, called Florida Supercon. He was looking to bring a large scale convention to south Florida. Another event, Anime Supercon, took place in Fort Lauderdale five months later. Estimated attendances at each event averaged around 2,000 people. As success grew, other conventions were added throughout the Fort Lauderdale and Miami metro areas.

An attempt was made in November 2008 to hold a longstanding Supercon outside of Florida, in Atlanta, Georgia, but it was not as prosperous as the Florida events. Another try didn't take place until July 2017 with Raleigh Supercon in North Carolina, replacing the promotional Wizard World Raleigh Comic Con which eventually moved to nearby Winston-Salem after the 2015 event. Raleigh Supercon 2017 drew in an estimated 30,000 people for the weekend. Super Conventions later acquired the former Derby City Comic Con in Louisville, Kentucky, which was re-branded as Louisville Supercon. The inaugural event took place in November 2018.

Two recent conventions, Animate! Florida (formerly known as Animate! Miami) and Paradise City Comic Con (formerly known as Magic City Comic Con), were discontinued in 2018 so Super Conventions could concentrate on their three Supercon events. Both of those had taken place in Miami.

Sale of Florida Supercon and convention name changes
On March 11, 2019, it was announced that Broder sold Florida Supercon and the "Supercon" trademark to ReedPop of Norwalk, Connecticut. The company owns a number of conventions around the world, including New York Comic Con and MCM London Comic Con. Management for the events in Raleigh and Louisville will remain the same under Broder, but are renamed as GalaxyCon. Also added are GalaxyCon events in Richmond, Virginia and Minneapolis, Minnesota. Florida Supercon, now managed by ReedPop, will continue to have its annual event in early July.

List of current GalaxyCon events

Notes: As a result of the COVID-19 pandemic, GalaxyCon Raleigh was rescheduled for July 29–August 1, 2021. In April, the convention announced that due to economic conditions and issues with the venue, GalaxyCon would not be returning to Louisville for 2020.

See also
Florida Supercon

References

External links
GalaxyCon (official website)
 GalaxyCon Louisville
GalaxyCon Minneapolis
GalaxyCon Raleigh
GalaxyCon Richmond

Comics conventions in the United States
Recurring events established in 2006
Conventions in Kentucky
Conventions in Minnesota
Conventions in North Carolina
Conventions in Virginia